Tommy Gate is an American brand of hydraulic liftgate, or tail lift, manufactured by Woodbine Manufacturing Company. The company was formed in 1965 by Delbert "Bus" Brown and its production facility is located in Woodbine, Iowa.

History
Prior to founding Woodbine Manufacturing Company, Delbert Brown manufactured farming equipment as Brown Manufacturing Company. After inventing what was then one of the first trenching machines, Brown Manufacturing Company was sold to Omaha Steel Works. Three years later, Brown founded Woodbine Manufacturing Company and began the Tommy Gate brand.

Expansion

The Woodbine manufacturing facility was initially built in 1965 to occupy 70,000 square feet of production space. It expanded in 1980 to 90,000 and once again in 2000 when it grew to 140,000. The most recent expansion, completed in 2011, grew the plant to an overall 200,000 square feet (including 40,000 square feet of warehouse space).

References

External links

Companies based in Iowa
Manufacturing companies based in Iowa
Logistics industry in the United States
Mechanical engineering
Hydraulics